Rudnik, Burgas Province was a village in Burgas Municipality, in Burgas Province, in southeastern Bulgaria.
It's a quarter of Burgas since 2015.

References

Villages in Burgas Province